Yaen (野猿,  "Wild Monkey") was a Japanese pop group composed of Takaaki Ishibashi and Noritake Kinashi of the comedy duo The Tunnels, and nine staff members from their television variety show The Tunnels' Thanks to Everyone. From 1998 to 2001, Yaen released three studio albums, eleven singles, and four concert videos, all of which reached the top ten on the Oricon charts.

History
Yaen was created by music producers Akimoto Yasushi and Tsugutoshi Gotō, who wrote parody songs for The Tunnels beginning in the 1980s. The group was originally formed for the purpose of performing a parody version of a KinKi Kids song on the music variety show Utaban, but subsequently signed with the record label Avex Trax and made their debut as a legitimate pop group on April 29, 1998.

Despite their novel origins, Yaen achieved considerable mainstream success: the group released three studio albums, eleven singles, and four concert videos, all of which reached the top ten on the Oricon charts. The group sold three million albums, and performed at Kōhaku Uta Gassen in two consecutive years. Several of the group's singles were choreographed by Sam, Etsu, and Chiharu from TRF. Yaen announced on February 8, 2001 that they would disband, citing a desire by its members to return to their original jobs. The group formally disbanded on May 13, 2001, following their final concert at Yoyogi National Gymnasium. Several of the group's members continued to work at The Tunnels' Thanks to Everyone in their original roles, and made occasional appearances on the series.

In 2009, Yaen reunited to mark the 21st anniversary of The Tunnels, where they participated in a one-off televised performance in which they attempted to replicate the choreography to their singles from memory. On March 9, 2011, in commemoration of the tenth anniversary of the group's disbandment, Yaen's songs were released on the digital streaming platform Recochoku.

Members
Original roles on The Tunnels' Thanks to Everyone are noted in parentheses.

 Taka (Takaaki Ishibashi), vocals (host)
 Nori (Noritake Kinashi), vocals (host)
 Terurin (Teruchika Hirayama),  vocals (acrylic decorations)
 Kanchan (Norihito Kannami), vocals (costumes)
 Narunaru (Kazuhiro Narui), dancer (large props)
 Jery (Ikuomi Iizuka), dancer (special effects)
 Baka (Takasho Ohara), dancer (large props)
 Shu (Takahisa Amino), dancer (props)
 Hosshi (Michiaki Hoshino), dancer (driver)
 Gote (Kazumichi Handa), dancer (photographer)
 Takaku (Seiji Takaku), dancer (camera crane)

Past members:
 CA (Chika Arai) (voiceover)
 Yoshiroucchi (Yoshiro Asano) (writer)

Directors Takashi Kanbara and Yan (Kazuya Ota) appear on the group's first single  "", but did not return for subsequent projects with Yaen.

Discography

Studio albums
  (March 10, 1999)
  (March 1, 2000)
  (March 14, 2001)

Singles
 "" (April 29, 1998)
 "" (September 17, 1998)
 "" (December 16, 1998)
 "" (February 24, 1999)
 "" (August 4, 1999)
 "" (November 10, 1999)
 "" (February 2, 2000)
 "" (May 31, 2000)
 "" (October 12, 2000)
 "" (January 24, 2001)
 "" (February 28, 2001)

Tour and concert recordings
  (July 7, 1999)
  (July 19, 2000)
  (May 3, 2001)
  (July 25, 2001)

References

External links
 Official website (defunct, link via Internet Archive)

Avex Trax artists
Japanese boy bands
Japanese pop music groups
Musical groups established in 1998
Musical groups disestablished in 2001
Musical groups from Tokyo
1998 establishments in Japan